Azam Talbievich Radzhabov (born 21 January 1993) is a Belarusian professional footballer who plays for Volna Pinsk.

Career
Before joining Gomel, he spent two years playing for reserve and youth teams in Dynamo Kyiv, but didn't have a chance for debut in a senior team.

External links
 
 
 Profile at Gomel website

1993 births
Living people
Belarusian footballers
Association football midfielders
Belarusian expatriate footballers
Expatriate footballers in Ukraine
FC Dynamo Kyiv players
FC Gomel players
FC Vitebsk players
FC Orsha players
FC Naftan Novopolotsk players
FC Volna Pinsk players